Iliad S.A. is a French provider of telecommunication services.  It is based in Paris and its operations comprise fixed and mobile telephony services, prepaid phone cards and internet access providing and hosting services.  The company was founded by Xavier Niel in 1990.

History 

Free Mobile, a subsidiary of Iliad, was launched in 2012.  As of December 2013, it was France's fourth largest mobile operator, having gained a 12% share of the market.

On August 1, 2014, Iliad SA publicly announced a bid to acquire a 56% stake in the United States wireless carrier T-Mobile US for US$16 billion. The bid came amidst reports that competing carrier Sprint Corporation, owned by Japanese firm Softbank, was planning its own US$24 billion merger. The bid was dropped in October 2014.

As of the end of 2012, the company was active in over 35 countries.

In 2019, Iliad made 5.33 billion revenue.

Iliad Italia, an Italian subsidiary of Iliad, was launched in Milan, Lombardy on May 29, 2018.

Subsidiaries
 Free (France)
 Free Mobile (France)
 Iliad Italia
 Play (Poland) and its subsidiaries, including Virgin Mobile (Poland)
 UPC Poland
 eir (Ireland)
 Scaleway (previously Online SAS or Online.net)

See also 

 Telecommunications in France
 Telecommunications in Italy
 Telecommunications in the Republic of Ireland

References

External links

 

Telecommunications companies of France
Companies based in Paris
French brands
Telecommunications companies established in 1990
1990 establishments in France
Companies listed on Euronext Paris